Cottonwood Air Force Station is a former United States Air Force General Surveillance Radar station. It was closed in 1965 and transferred to the state of Idaho in 1974, when it was converted to its present use as a minimum-security correctional facility.

Cottonwood Peak Air Force Station was initially part of Phase II of the Air Defense Command Mobile Radar program. The Air Force approved this expansion of the Mobile Radar program on October 23, 1952.  Radars in this network were designated "SM."

History
The station became operational on 1 July 1958 when the 822d Aircraft Control and Warning Squadron (AC&W Sq) was assigned to the new station.  The station consisted of 66 buildings, including operation and administrative facilities, 3 dormitories, 27 family housing units, 3 radar domes, and the normal support facilities/utilities. The site was divided into three general areas: the operations area at the summit, cantonment area at mid-mountain, and a family housing area at the north end of the city of Cottonwood.  The 822d AC&W Sq operated used AN/MPS-7, AN/MPS-14, and AN/FPS-6 radars, and initially the station functioned as a Ground-Control Intercept (GCI) and warning station.  As a GCI station, the squadron's role was to guide interceptor aircraft toward unidentified intruders picked up on the unit's radar scopes.

During 1960 Cottonwood AFS joined the Semi Automatic Ground Environment (SAGE) system, feeding data to DC-07 at Larson AFB, Washington.  After joining, the squadron was redesignated as the 822d Radar Squadron (SAGE) on  1 September 1960.  The radar squadron provided information 24/7 the SAGE Direction Center where it was analyzed to determine range, direction altitude speed and whether or not aircraft were friendly or hostile.  In 1962 the 822d began operating an AN/FPS-24 search radar and an additional AN/FPS-6B radar, as the AN/MPS-7 and AN/MPS-14 units were retired.  In 1964 the AN/FPS-6B was upgraded to an AN/FPS-90 and Cottonwood AFS was shifted to feeding data to the SAGE Data center DC-12 at McChord AFB.

In addition to the main facility, Cottonwood operated an AN/FPS-14 Gap Filler site:
  Waha, ID   (SM-150A) 

The closure of the base was announced in November 1964. 
A catastrophic bearing failure in the AN/FPS-24 antenna pedestal led to an early shutdown of the station and the inactivation of the 822d Radar Squadron on 25 June 1965 (only two or three years after the AN/FPS-24 radome was installed over the antenna) as part of fiscal year 1965 cutbacks.

The Cantonment Area was used from 1965 to 1974 by the Office of Economic Opportunity as a Job Corps Center. The State of Idaho Dept. of Corrections acquired the property in 1974, and has occupied the site ever since as North Idaho Correctional Institution. This is a program-specific prison designed for male offenders sentenced to a retained jurisdiction commitment by the court. It provides a sentencing alternative for the courts to target those offenders who might, after a period of programming and evaluation, be viable candidates for probation rather than incarceration.

Today most of the radar site on the mountain summit is torn down. The AN/FPS-24 tower still stands but little else, as only building foundations and deteriorated streets remain.

Air Force units and assignments

Units
 Constituted as the 822d Aircraft Control and Warning Squadron
 Activated at Geiger Field, Washington on 1 February 1957
 Moved to Cottonwood AFS on 1 July 1958
 Redesignated as the 822d Radar Squadron (SAGE), 1 September 1960
 Discontinued and inactivated on 25 June 1965

Assignments
 9th Air Division, 1 July 1958
 25th Air Division, 15 August 1958
 4700th Air Defense Wing, 1 September 1958
 Spokane Air Defense Sector, 15 March 1960
 Seattle Air Defense Sector, 1 June 1963 - 25 June 1965

See also
 List of USAF Aerospace Defense Command General Surveillance Radar Stations

References

 Cornett, Lloyd H. and Johnson, Mildred W., A Handbook of Aerospace Defense Organization  1946 - 1980,  Office of History, Aerospace Defense Center, Peterson AFB, CO (1980).
 Winkler, David F. & Webster, Julie L., Searching the Skies, The Legacy of the United States Cold War Defense Radar Program,  US Army Construction Engineering Research Laboratories, Champaign, IL (1997).
 Information for Cottonwood AFS, ID

Installations of the United States Air Force in Idaho
Semi-Automatic Ground Environment sites
Aerospace Defense Command military installations
Buildings and structures in Idaho County, Idaho
Military installations established in 1958
Military installations closed in 1965
1958 establishments in Idaho
1965 disestablishments in Idaho